Michael Allan York (born January 3, 1978) is an American former professional ice hockey left winger. He last played and captained the Iserlohn Roosters of the Deutsche Eishockey Liga (DEL).

Playing career
York was born in Waterford, Michigan. As a youth, he played in the 1991 Quebec International Pee-Wee Hockey Tournament with the Detroit Little Caesars minor ice hockey team. He later played for the Detroit Compuware Ambassadors, where he scored 136 goals in 1993–94. He attended Lutheran High School Northwest in Rochester Hills, Michigan, and from there went to Ontario where he played for the MTHL's Thornhill Islanders. It was there that he led the league in scoring and was named rookie of the year. His play in Ontario drew the attention of Michigan State University  where he spent four years as a member of the Spartans hockey team. He was a Hobey Baker Memorial Award finalist and NCAA All-American in 1998 and 1999 and CCHA Player of the Year in 1999.

York was drafted in the 6th round of the 1997 NHL Entry Draft by the New York Rangers. During his time playing for the Rangers, York played on a line with Theoren Fleury and Eric Lindros. This was nicknamed the "FLY" line, getting its name from the last initial of each player on it. He was named to the 1999–2000 NHL All-Rookie team, scoring 26 goals during his rookie season. In 2002, York was a member of the silver medal-winning Team USA in the 2002 Winter Olympics in Salt Lake City, and played in the 52nd National Hockey League All-Star Game as a member of the North American team.

He was later dealt to the Edmonton Oilers in exchange for defenseman Tom Poti, who had become a target of fans for his perceived indifference. In Edmonton, York became an integral part of the team, playing on the top two lines and also on the penalty kill, where for a time he formed a formidable duo with Todd Marchant. In the 2004–05 season, he played in Germany for the Iserlohn Roosters in the Deutsche Eishockey Liga. He was the second best scorer in the whole league. On August 3, 2005, York was traded from the Oilers to the New York Islanders with a conditional draft pick in exchange for Michael Peca. After a season and a half with the Islanders, he was traded to the Philadelphia Flyers for Randy Robitaille and a 5th round draft pick on December 20, 2006. He signed with the Phoenix Coyotes to a 1-year, $1 million contract in the off-season.

On July 11, 2008, York signed a contract with KHL team HC Sibir Novosibirsk; he opted out of this deal on July 25, after he signed a one-year deal with the Columbus Blue Jackets.  Following that season, on August 19, 2009, he signed an AHL-only contract with the Rochester Americans, allowing him to sign with any NHL team during the season. On September 10, 2010, he signed a one-year contract with the Lahti Pelicans of the Finnish Liiga.

York scored 27 points in 52 games as the Pelicans narrowly avoided relegation. On May 13, 2011, York left to sign a one-year contract returning to Germany with the Iserlohn Roosters, with whom he spent a season from the 2004 NHL lockout.

After a total of six seasons within the Roosters organization, York was not re-signed by the club following the 2015–16 season. Earning a cult status throughout his tenure in Iserlohn, it was announced that York's number 78 would be taken out of circulation, to be retired by the club at a later date. On September 2, 2016, York announced the end of his playing career, in accepting a student assistant coaching role in returning to Michigan State University to complete a communications degree.

Career statistics

Regular season and playoffs

International

Awards and honors

References

External links
 

1978 births
American men's ice hockey centers
Columbus Blue Jackets players
Edmonton Oilers players
Hartford Wolf Pack players
Ice hockey players from Michigan
Iserlohn Roosters players
Living people
Ice hockey players at the 2002 Winter Olympics
Medalists at the 2002 Winter Olympics
Michigan State Spartans men's ice hockey players
National Hockey League All-Stars
New York Islanders players
New York Rangers draft picks
New York Rangers players
Olympic silver medalists for the United States in ice hockey
Lahti Pelicans players
People from Waterford, Michigan
Phoenix Coyotes players
Philadelphia Flyers players
Syracuse Crunch players
AHCA Division I men's ice hockey All-Americans